John Tuigg (February 19, 1820 – December 7, 1889) was an Irish-born prelate of the Roman Catholic Church.  He served as the third bishop of the Diocese of Pittsburgh in Pennsylvania from 1876 to 1889.

Biography

Early life 

John Tuigg was born in on February 19, 1820, in Donoughmore, Ireland. He was  educated at All Hallows College in Drumcondra.

In 1849, when Bishop Michael O'Connor traveled to Dublin, to recruit volunteers for missionary work in America, Tuigg was the first to respond. He reached Pittsburgh in December 1849, and finished his studies at St. Michael's Seminary, where he was appointed professor for a brief time.

Priesthood 
Tuigg was ordained a priest by Bishop Michael O’Connor on May 14, 1850, and was soon after appointed secretary to Bishop Michael Domenec. He also served as an assistant priest in Saint Paul Cathedral. Tuigg was then transferred to St. Bridget's Parish, and began to erect a new church. Soon, however, he was transferred to mission work in Altoona, Pennsylvania, where he remained until 1876.

Tuigg had been appointed vicar general for the eastern part of the diocese of Pittsburgh, but the Diocese of Allegheny was split from the Diocese of Pittsburgh and Domenec was selected to lead the new diocese. Pope Pius IX decided to make Tuigg the new bishop of Pittsburgh and would not accept any declination of the honor.

Bishop of Pittsburgh 
Tuigg was appointed bishop of the Diocese of Pittsburgh on January11, 1876.  On March 19, 1876 he was consecrated bishop of Pittsburgh by Archbishop James Frederick Bryan Wood. Upon his accession he found that the Panic of 1873 had left the diocese's property and finances in disarray. Yet Tuigg extricated the diocese from its difficulties.

Upon Domenec's retirement as bishop of the Diocese of Allegheny in 1877, the former diocese was left sede vacante, without a bishop. Tuigg was appointed apostolic administrator of the territory, but this new and increased burden was more than he could bear, and Tuigg's health began to give way. After having suffered a paralytic stroke, he took a sabbatical. Though he had begun to recover, Tuigg returned, and suffered another stroke. His bad health forced the Vatican to appoint Richard Phelan as coadjutor bishop to run the diocese.  At the time, the combined Pittsburgh and Allegheny dioceses contained 133 churches and 191 chapels, convents, and educational institutions. 

John Tuigg died in Altoona on December 7, 1889 at age 69.  He is buried in the cemetery of St. John Church in that city.

References

Bibliography 

 

1820 births
1889 deaths
19th-century Irish people
People from County Cork
Alumni of All Hallows College, Dublin
Roman Catholic bishops of Pittsburgh
19th-century Roman Catholic bishops in the United States
American Roman Catholic clergy of Irish descent